Playboy: The Mansion Soundtrack is a soundtrack album by American DJ / producer Felix da Housecat, released in 2005.

It was released as the soundtrack to the 2005 business simulation video game Playboy: The Mansion, but it also contains several tracks not present in the game, making some view it as a "promotional tie-in".

Track listing

References

2005 albums
Felix da Housecat albums